HMS Thrasher was a "thirty-knotter" torpedo boat destroyer of the British Royal Navy. She was completed by Laird, Son & Company, Birkenhead, in 1897.  One of four Quail-class destroyers (later classed as part of the B-class), she served in the First World War, sinking the German submarine  in 1917, and was sold off after hostilities ended.

Design and construction
As part of its 1894–1895 shipbuilding programme for the Royal Navy, the British Admiralty placed orders with Laird Brothers for four destroyers. The destroyers ordered under the 1894–1895 programme had a contracted speed of  rather than the  required of previous destroyers. Armament was specified to be a QF 12 pounder 12 cwt ( calibre), with a secondary armament of five 6-pounder guns, and two 18-inch (450 mm) torpedo tubes. As with other early Royal Navy destroyers, the detailed design was left to the builder, with the Admiralty laying down only broad requirements.

Displacement was  light and  full load, while crew was 63.

Thrasher was laid down at Laird's Birkenhead shipyard as Yard Number 608 on 30 May 1895, as the third of the four destroyers ordered from Laird's, and was launched on 5 November 1895. Thrasher commissioned in June 1897.

Service history

Pre-war service
Newly commissioned, Thrasher took part in the naval review off Spithead on 26 June 1897 to celebrate the Diamond Jubilee of Queen Victoria. On 20 August 1897, Thrasher collided with the cruiser  in the English Channel, killing one crewmember. Thrashers helmsman was blamed for the accident by a court-martial and was dismissed from the ship. On 29 September 1897, Thrasher and the destroyer  ran aground in a fog off Dodman Point, Cornwall. The grounding caused a steam main aboard Thrasher to rupture, killing four stokers. While both ships were refloated, Thrasher was badly damaged and after repair was no longer as fast as her sister ships. The ship's commanding officer, Commander Travers, was severely reprimanded by the resulting court-martial.

On 5 December 1901 Thrasher was commissioned by Lieutenant and Commander C. D. S. Raikes as tender to the battleship Formidable on the Mediterranean station. She left Devonport for Malta in January the following year, returning to home waters in 1906. While at Malta she was in May 1902 again involved a collision, with the destroyer Coquette, and had her stern damaged. In 1910, Thrasher formed part of the Fifth Destroyer Flotilla.

On 30 August 1912 the Admiralty directed all destroyers were to be grouped into classes designated by letters based on contract speed and appearance. As a four-funneled 30-knotter destroyer, Thrasher was assigned to the B Class. In 1912, older destroyers were transferred to patrol flotillas, with Thrasher forming part of the Seventh Flotilla, based at Devonport, by March 1913. Thrasher, still based at Devonport as part of the Seventh Flotilla, took part in the search for the missing submarine  (which had sunk in Whitsand Bay, Cornwall on 16 January), with Thrashers commanding officer dying of a chill caught during the search.

First World War
On the outbreak of the First World War, the Seventh Flotilla moved to the East coast of England. Thrasher remained with the Flotilla through 1915 and 1916. On 8 February 1917, Thrasher spotted the German submarine  while the submarine was in the process of attacking a merchant ship off Flamborough Head, Yorkshire. When UC-39 dived, Thrasher responded with a depth charge which badly damaged the submarine, which was forced to the surface. Thrasher fired on the surfaced submarine until it was realised that UC-39s crew was surrendering. Thrasher rescued 17 Germans together with two British sailors who had been held prisoner aboard UC-39, with seven Germans killed. UC-39 sank while attempts were being made to tow the submarine to port.

By September 1917, Thrasher transferred to the local Patrol Flotilla on the Nore, remaining on that station until the end of the war. Thrasher was sold for scrap on 4 November 1919.

Pennant numbers

Citations

References
 
 
 
 
 
 
 
 
 

 

Quail-class destroyers
Ships built on the River Mersey
1895 ships
Maritime incidents in 1897
B-class destroyers (1913)
World War I destroyers of the United Kingdom